Guglielmo Ferrero (21 July 1871 — 3 August 1942) was an Italian historian, journalist and novelist, author of the Greatness and Decline of Rome (5 volumes, published after English translation 1907–1909). Ferrero devoted his writings to classical liberalism and he opposed any kind of dictatorship and unlimited government. He was nominated for the Nobel Prize in Literature eighteen times in five years and twice for the Nobel Peace Prize.

Biography
Born in Portici, near Naples, Ferrero studied law in Pisa, Bologna and Turin. Soon afterward he married Gina Lombroso, a daughter of Cesare Lombroso, the criminologist and psychiatrist with whom he wrote The Female Offender, The Prostitute and The Normal Woman. In 1891-1894 Ferrero traveled extensively in Europe and in 1897 wrote The Young Europe, a book which had a strong influence over James Joyce.

After studying the history of Rome Ferrero turned to political essays and novels (Between Two Worlds in 1913, Speeches to the Deaf in 1925 and The Two Truths in 1933-1939). When the fascist reign of Black Shirts forced liberal intellectuals to leave Italy in 1925, Ferrero refused and was placed under house arrest. In 1929 Ferrero accepted a professorship at the Graduate Institute of International Studies in Geneva. His last works (Adventure, Bonaparte in Italy, The Reconstruction of Europe, The Principles of Power and The Two French Revolutions) were dedicated to the French Revolution and Napoleon. In 1935 his daughter Nina Ferrero married the Yugoslavian diplomat Bogdan Raditsa.

Ferrero was invited to the White House in 1908 by Theodore Roosevelt, who had read The Greatness and Decline of Rome. He gave lectures in the northeast of the USA which were collected and published in 1909 as Characters and Events of Roman History.

He died in 1942 at the Mont Pèlerin, Switzerland.

Works

In Italian
 Roma Antica, 3 vols., Firenze: Le Monnier, 1921–22, with Corrado Barbagallo

In English translation
 Militarism a contribution to the Peace Crusade (1903).
 The Greatness and Decline of Rome translated in five volumes by Sir Alfred Zimmern (Volumes 1 and 2) and the Reverend H J Chaytor (Volumes 3 to 5)
 Volume 1: The Empire-Builders (1907).
 Volume 2: Julius Caesar (1907).
 Volume 3: The Fall of an Aristocracy (1907).
 Volume 4: Rome and Egypt (1908).
 Volume 5: The Republic of Augustus (1909).
 Characters and Events of Roman History from Caesar to Nero (1909).
 The Women of the Caesars (1911).
 Between the Old World and the New, a novel (1914).
 Ancient Rome and Modern America, a comparative study of morals and manners (1914).
 A Short History of Rome (with Corrado Barbagallo) translated in two volumes by George Chrystal (1918).
 Volume 1: 754 BC to 44 BC
 Volume 2: 44 BC to 476 AD  
 Europe's Fateful Hour (1918).
 Problems of Peace, from the Holy Alliance to the League of Nations, a message from a European writer to Americans (1919).
 The Ruin of the Ancient Civilization and the Triumph of Christianity, with some consideration of conditions in the Europe of today (1921).
 Peace and War (1933).
 The Reconstruction of Europe: Talleyrand and the Congress of Vienna 1814-1845 (1941).

Selected articles
 "Puritanism," The Atlantic Monthly, Vol. CVI, 1910.
 "American Characteristics," The Atlantic Monthly, Vol. CVI, 1910.
 "The Dangers of War in Europe," The Atlantic Monthly, Vol. CXI, 1913.

In French translation
 Les lois psychologiques du symbolisme, Paris, Félix Alcan, 1895. Published under the name of "Guillaume Ferrero".

References

Further reading
 Cook, Thomas I. (1952). "Guglielmo Ferrero (1871-1942) and the Bi-Polar World," The Western Political Quarterly, Vol. 5, No. 1, pp. 20–30.

External links

 
 
 Works by Guglielmo Ferrero, at JSTOR
 Free e-books by Ferrero
 

1871 births
1942 deaths
20th-century Italian historians
Italian classical scholars
Historians of ancient Rome
Historians of fascism
Italian journalists
Italian male journalists
Italian essayists
Male essayists
Italian male writers
Italian anti-fascists
People from Portici
Italian expatriates in Switzerland
Academic staff of the Graduate Institute of International and Development Studies
Italian male non-fiction writers